44th Division may refer to:

Infantry divisions
44th Reserve Division (German Empire)
44th Landwehr Division (German Empire)
44th Infantry Division (Germany) (World War II)
44th Infantry Division Cremona (Kingdom of Italy)
44th Division (Imperial Japanese Army)
44th Infantry Division (Poland)
44th Rifle Division (Soviet Union), a unit of the Red Army reformed during World War II
44th (Home Counties) Division (United Kingdom)
44th Infantry Division (United States)

Airborne divisions
 44th Airborne Division (India) (British Indian Army during World War II)
 242nd Training Centre (44th Training Airborne Division)

Armoured divisions
 44th Armoured Division (India)

Aviation divisions
44th Air Division (United States Air Force)